Jonna Patricia Marie Sundling (born 28 December 1994) is a Swedish cross-country skier who represents the club Piteå Elit.

Cross-country skiing results
All results are sourced from the International Ski Federation (FIS).

Olympic Games
3 medals – (1 gold, 1 silver, 1 bronze)

World Championships
4 medals – (4 gold)

World Cup

Season standings

Individual podiums
 7 victories – (6 , 1 ) 
 21 podiums – (15 , 6 )

Team podiums
 3 victories – (1 , 2 ) 
 8 podiums – (3 , 5 )

References

External links

1994 births
Living people
Swedish female cross-country skiers
Tour de Ski skiers
IFK Umeå skiers
Cross-country skiers at the 2012 Winter Youth Olympics
FIS Nordic World Ski Championships medalists in cross-country skiing
Sportspeople from Umeå
Olympic cross-country skiers of Sweden
Cross-country skiers at the 2022 Winter Olympics
Medalists at the 2022 Winter Olympics
Olympic medalists in cross-country skiing
Olympic gold medalists for Sweden
Olympic silver medalists for Sweden
Olympic bronze medalists for Sweden
21st-century Swedish women